Saint-Pierre-en-Faucigny is a commune in the Haute-Savoie department in the Auvergne-Rhône-Alpes region in Eastern France.

It is located in the historical province of Faucigny in Savoy hence its name. The town had 6,389 inhabitants in 2016. It was born from the fusion in 1965 of the communes of Passeirier, Saint-Maurice-de-Rumilly and Saint-Pierre-de-Rumilly.

Saint-Pierre-en-Faucigny is situated between Bonneville just to the east and La Roche-sur-Foron to the west.

Demographics

Transport 
The commune has a railway station, on the La Roche-sur-Foron–Saint-Gervais-les-Bains-Le Fayet line.

Twin towns — sister cities
Saint-Pierre-en-Faucigny is twinned with Saint-Pierre, Aosta Valley, Italy.

See also
Communes of the Haute-Savoie department

References

Communes of Haute-Savoie